The Băcâia is a left tributary of the river Geoagiu in Romania. It flows into the Geoagiu in Bozeș.

References

Rivers of Hunedoara County
Rivers of Romania